The Italian general election of 1994 took place on 27 March 1994.

The election was won in Sardinia by the centre-right Pole of Good Government. The Pact for Italy and the Patto Segni, both led by Sardinian Mario Segni had their best result in the region, while the Sardinian Action Party had a remarkable result in single-seat constituencies.

Results

Chamber of Deputies

|- bgcolor="#E9E9E9"
!style="background-color:#E9E9E9" align=left rowspan=2 valign=bottom|Coalitions
!colspan="3" align="center" valign=top|Single-seat constituencies
!colspan="5" align="center" valign=top|Proportional system
!colspan="1" align="center" valign=top|Total
|-
|- bgcolor="#E9E9E9"
|align="center" valign=top|votes
|align="center" valign=top|votes (%)
|align="center" valign=top|seats
|align="center" valign=top|Parties
|align="center" valign=top|votes
|align="center" valign=top|votes (%)
|align="center" valign=top|seats
|align="center" valign=top|tot.
|align="center" valign=top|seats

|-
|rowspan="3" align="left" valign=top|Pole of Good Government
|rowspan="3" align="right" valign=top|362,110
|rowspan="3" align="right" valign=top|35.1
|rowspan="3" align="right" valign=top|9

|rowspan="1" align="left"|Forza Italia
|align="right"|245,630
|align="right"|21.2
|align="right"|1

|rowspan="3" align="right" valign=top|1
|rowspan="3" align="right" valign=top|10

|-

|rowspan="1" align="left"|National Alliance
|align="right"|137,874
|align="right"|11.9
|align="right"|-

|-

|rowspan="1" align="left"|Pannella List
|align="right"|32,926
|align="right"|2.8
|align="right"|-

|-
|rowspan="6" align="left" valign=top|Alliance of Progressives
|rowspan="6" align="right" valign=top|305,395
|rowspan="6" align="right" valign=top|29.6
|rowspan="6" align="right" valign=top|4

|rowspan="1" align="left"|Democratic Party of the Left
|align="right"|228,199
|align="right"|19.7
|align="right"|1

|rowspan="6" align="right" valign=top|1
|rowspan="6" align="right" valign=top|5

|-

|rowspan="1" align="left"|Communist Refoundation Party
|align="right"|70,813
|align="right"|6.1
|align="right"|-

|-

|rowspan="1" align="left"|Italian Socialist Party
|align="right"|36,651
|align="right"|3.2
|align="right"|-

|-

|rowspan="1" align="left"|Democratic Alliance
|align="right"|26,074
|align="right"|2.3
|align="right"|-

|-

|rowspan="1" align="left"|Federation of the Greens
|align="right"|24,452
|align="right"|2.1
|align="right"|-

|-

|rowspan="1" align="left"|The Network
|align="right"|7,615
|align="right"|0.7
|align="right"|-

|-
|rowspan="2" align="left" valign=top|Pact for Italy
|rowspan="2" align="right" valign=top|231,362
|rowspan="2" align="right" valign=top|22.5
|rowspan="2" align="right" valign=top|1

|rowspan="1" align="left"|Segni Pact
|align="right"|211,810
|align="right"|17.4
|align="right"|1

|rowspan="2" align="right" valign=top|2
|rowspan="2" align="right" valign=top|3

|-

|rowspan="1" align="left"|Italian People's Party
|align="right"|114,867
|align="right"|10.0
|align="right"|1

|-
|rowspan="1" align="left"|Sardinian Action Party
|rowspan="1" align="right"|82,258
|rowspan="1" align="right"|8.0
|rowspan="1" align="right"|-

|rowspan="1" align="left"|-
|align="right"|-
|align="right"|-
|align="right"|-

|rowspan="1" align="right"|-
|rowspan="1" align="right"|-

|-
|rowspan="1" align="left"|Independentist Sardinian Party
|rowspan="1" align="right"|14,334
|rowspan="1" align="right"|1.4
|rowspan="1" align="right"|-

|rowspan="1" align="left"|Independentist Sardinian Party
|align="right"|24,043
|align="right"|2.1
|align="right"|-

|rowspan="1" align="right"|-
|rowspan="1" align="right"|-

|-
|rowspan="1" align="left"|Others
|rowspan="1" align="right"|35,598
|rowspan="1" align="right"|3.4
|rowspan="1" align="right"|-

|rowspan="1" align="left"|others
|align="right"|9,326
|align="right"|0.8
|align="right"|-

|rowspan="1" align="right"|-
|rowspan="1" align="right"|-

|-
|- bgcolor="#E9E9E9"
!rowspan="1" align="left" valign="top"|Total coalitions
!rowspan="1" align="right" valign="top"|1,030,324
!rowspan="1" align="right" valign="top"|100.0
!rowspan="1" align="right" valign="top"|14
!rowspan="1" align="left" valign="top"|Total parties
!rowspan="1" align="right" valign="top"|1,160,280
!rowspan="1" align="right" valign="top"|100.0
!rowspan="1" align="right" valign="top"|4
!rowspan="1" align="right" valign="top"|4
!rowspan="1" align="right" valign="top"|18
|}
Sources: Ministry of the Interior and Istituto Cattaneo

Senate

|- bgcolor="#E9E9E9"
!style="background-color:#E9E9E9" align=left rowspan=2 valign=bottom|Coalitions
!colspan="3" align="center" valign=top|Single-seat constituencies
!colspan="1" align="center" valign=top|Prop.
!colspan="1" align="center" valign=top|Total
|-
|- bgcolor="#E9E9E9"
|align="center" valign=top|votes
|align="center" valign=top|votes (%)
|align="center" valign=top|seats
|align="center" valign=top|seats
|align="center" valign=top|seats
|-
|rowspan="1" align="left" valign=top|Alliance of Progressives
|rowspan="1" align="right" valign=top|267,853
|rowspan="1" align="right" valign=top|31.4
|rowspan="1" align="right" valign=top|2
|rowspan="1" align="right" valign=top|1
|rowspan="1" align="right" valign=top|3
|-
|rowspan="1" align="left" valign=top|Pole of Good Government
|rowspan="1" align="right" valign=top|244,532
|rowspan="1" align="right" valign=top|28.6
|rowspan="1" align="right" valign=top|3
|rowspan="1" align="right" valign=top|1
|rowspan="1" align="right" valign=top|4
|-
|rowspan="1" align="left"|Pact for Italy
|rowspan="1" align="right" valign=top|207,800
|rowspan="1" align="right" valign=top|24.3
|rowspan="1" align="right" valign=top|1
|rowspan="1" align="right" valign=top|1
|rowspan="1" align="right" valign=top|2
|-
|rowspan="1" align="left"|Sardinian Action Party
|rowspan="1" align="right" valign=top|88,225
|rowspan="1" align="right" valign=top|10.3
|rowspan="1" align="right" valign=top|-
|rowspan="1" align="right" valign=top|-
|rowspan="1" align="right" valign=top|-
|-
|rowspan="1" align="left"|Independentist Sardinian Party
|rowspan="1" align="right" valign=top|26,198
|rowspan="1" align="right" valign=top|3.1
|rowspan="1" align="right" valign=top|-
|rowspan="1" align="right" valign=top|-
|rowspan="1" align="right" valign=top|-
|-
|rowspan="1" align="left"|The Network
|rowspan="1" align="right" valign=top|12,560
|rowspan="1" align="right" valign=top|1.5
|rowspan="1" align="right" valign=top|-
|rowspan="1" align="right" valign=top|-
|rowspan="1" align="right" valign=top|-
|-
|rowspan="1" align="left"|Others
|rowspan="1" align="right" valign=top|7,043
|rowspan="1" align="right" valign=top|0.8
|rowspan="1" align="right" valign=top|-
|rowspan="1" align="right" valign=top|-
|rowspan="1" align="right" valign=top|-
|-
|- bgcolor="#E9E9E9"
!rowspan="1" align="left" valign="top"|Total coalitions
!rowspan="1" align="right" valign="top"|854,211
!rowspan="1" align="right" valign="top"|100.0
!rowspan="1" align="right" valign="top"|6
!rowspan="1" align="right" valign="top"|3
!rowspan="1" align="right" valign="top"|9
|}
 Source: Ministry of the Interior

Elections in Sardinia
1994 elections in Italy
March 1994 events in Europe